The Battle of Kama was fought due to the consequences of Battle of Maonda, Madho Singh followed up his victory and advanced towards Bharatpur territory with 16,000 men.

Battle
Upon knowing of Madho's invasion Jawahar employed 10,000 Sikhs and increased Madecs pay in order to employ more Sepoys. On 29 February 1768, the two armies met outside Kama and a fight followed in which the Bharatpur army were beaten back and forced to retreat, with the loss of their general Dan Sahi. Jawahar Singh did not try to fight Madho Singh with his regular soldiers and instead chose to hire more Sikh mercenaries. He hired 20,000 Sikh mercenaries at a cost of seven lakhs a month, after which Madho Singh retreated to his own country.

Aftermath
Kama was the last battle fought by Madho Singh as he fell ill and died in March 1768. After the battle, the Marathas and Shuja-ud-Daula had schemed to form an alliance with the British to destroy Bharatpur. However this did not work as the English refused to march so far away from their base.

Jawahar Singh avoided any major conflicts after this war, but sent his general Madec for punitive campaigns. He was soon killed by a trusted soldier in July 1768.

References

Kama
1768 in India
History of Rajasthan
Kama
Kama